The 2015 Elite One is the 55th season of the Cameroon Top League. The season began on 8 February 2015. Cotonsport won their third consecutive title and 14th overall, all in the last 19 years.

Cotonsport clinched the title in the final round of the season, holding onto their 1-point lead over Union Douala when both teams closed the season with a draw. Union Douala picked up a road point with a 1-1 score at New Star, while Cotonsport played a scoreless home tie against Botafogo FC. With their respective top-two finishes, Cotonsport and Union Douala qualified for the 2016 CAF Champions League. New Star and Botafogo finished in a third-place tie and will play a play-off to determine the 2016 CAF Confederation Cup qualifier.

Canon, Njala Quan and Tonnerre finished 16th, 17th and 18th, respectively and will be relegated to Elite Two for the 2016 season. While there was no doubt about the fates of Njala Quan and Tonnerre, Canon could have escaped relegation with a win in their final game, but played Cosmos de Bafia to a 1-1 draw on the road to seal their fate.

Teams locations

Elite One was reduced from 19 to 18 teams for the 2015 season with four clubs relegated to Elite Two and only three promoted. Renaissance, Scorpion de Bé, Sable Batié and Douala AC were all relegated to Elite Two after finishing in the last four spot of the 2014 season. Dragon de Yaoundé, Botafogo FC and Lion Blessé were each promoted from Elite Two.

League table

Results
All teams play in a double round robin system (home and away).

References

Elite One seasons
Cam
Cam
1